Lucienne Benoît is a former French racing cyclist. She won the French national road race title in 1951.

References

External links

Year of birth missing (living people)
Living people
French female cyclists
Place of birth missing (living people)